Spilosoma holoxantha is a moth in the family Erebidae. It was described by George Hampson in 1907. It is found in Nigeria and Uganda.

Description
In 1920 Hampson described a female as:

References

Moths described in 1907
holoxantha